The Haskell Platform is a collection of software packages, tools and libraries that create a common platform for using and developing applications in Haskell. With the Haskell Platform, Haskell follows the same principle as Python: "Batteries included". Since 2022, the Haskell Platform has been deprecated.

Motivation 

The Haskell Platform aims to unify Haskell development tools into a single package, consisting of a compiler, compiling tools and many standard libraries, therefore making it easier to develop and deploy full-featured Haskell-driven applications.

Packages included 
Currently it consists of:

 GHC, Haskell's flagship compiler
 The GHC-Profiler
 GHCi, GHCs bytecode-interpreter
 The GHCi-Debugger
 Alex, a lexer generator, similar to Lex
 Happy, a parser generator, similar to Yacc 
 Cabal, a package manager
 Haddock, a documentation tool
 hsc2hs, a preprocessor for binding Haskell to C code, allowing C libraries to be used from Haskell
 various libraries, such as zlib, cgi and OpenGL

Deployment 
It is available for Ubuntu, Arch Linux, FreeBSD, Gentoo Linux (x86-64 and x86), Fedora, Debian (stable) and NixOS. One-click installers exist for OS X (only Intel) and Microsoft Windows.

Versions 
Originally, the Haskell Platform aimed at a 6-months release cycle. Starting with 7.10.2 which was released July 29, 2015, it has followed the release cycle of GHC and has since used the same version numbering scheme.

Deprecation 
In 2022, the Haskell Platform was deprecated, and is no longer an actively supported or recommended way of installing Haskell.

References

External links 

Haskell programming language family